Westport is a town located in Sand Creek Township, Decatur County, Indiana. The population was 1,379 at the 2010 census. A covered bridge, built in 1880, is located about 1.5 miles east of town.

History
Westport was laid out in March 1836. Simeon Sharp and Hockersmith Merryman were the founders of Westport when 20 lots were laid out based around a center point at the intersection of Main and Poplar Streets.  The Westport post office was established in 1839, but first spelled West Port.

Geography
Westport is located at  (39.176143, -85.574167).

Demographics

2010 census
As of the census of 2010, there were 1,379 people, 548 households, and 369 families living in the town. The racial makeup of the town was 98.5% White, 0.1% African American, 0.2% Native American, 0.1% Asian, and 1.1% from two or more races. Hispanic or Latino of any race were 0.9% of the population.

There were 548 households, of which 34.7% had children under the age of 18 living with them, 48.0% were married couples living together, 14.8% had a female householder with no husband present, 4.6% had a male householder with no wife present, and 32.7% were non-families. 27.7% of all households were made up of individuals, and 11.1% had someone living alone who was 65 years of age or older. The average household size was 2.52 and the average family size was 3.08.

The median age in the town was 36.4 years. 27.6% of residents were under the age of 18; 8.3% were between the ages of 18 and 24; 26.1% were from 25 to 44; 23.8% were from 45 to 64; and 14.1% were 65 years of age or older. The gender makeup of the town was 48.5% male and 51.5% female.

2000 census
As of the census of 2000, there were 1,515 people, 606 households, and 426 families living in the town. The racial makeup of the town was 99.21% White, 0.07% Native American, 0.07% Asian, 0.20% from other races, and 0.46% from two or more races. Hispanic or Latino of any race were 0.20% of the population.

There were 606 households, out of which 35.1% had children under the age of 18 living with them, 54.8% were married couples living together, 9.6% had a female householder with no husband present, and 29.7% were non-families. 26.2% of all households were made up of individuals, and 10.6% had someone living alone who was 65 years of age or older. The average household size was 2.50 and the average family size was 3.00.

In the town, the population was spread out, with 27.6% under the age of 18, 7.9% from 18 to 24, 30.6% from 25 to 44, 21.5% from 45 to 64, and 12.4% who were 65 years of age or older. The median age was 33 years. For every 100 females, there were 94.0 males. For every 100 females age 18 and over, there were 92.5 males.

The median income for a household in the town was $37,500, and the median income for a family was $47,826. Males had a median income of $31,890 versus $27,621 for females. The per capita income for the town was $18,298. About 6.5% of families and 10.5% of the population were below the poverty line, including 16.7% of those under age 18 and 3.0% of those age 65 or over.

References

External links
 Town of Westport, Indiana website

Towns in Decatur County, Indiana
Towns in Indiana
1836 establishments in Indiana
Populated places established in 1836